Petrocosmea kerrii is a species of flowering plant in the family Gesneriaceae, sometimes cultivated as a houseplant. In the past, it has been erroneously placed in the genus Damrongia. It was first described by William Grant Craib in 1918.

It is divided into two subspecies:
 P. k. var. crinita W. T. Wang
 P. k. var. kerrii

References

External links

 

kerrii
Flora of Thailand
House plants
Plants described in 1918
Taxa named by William Grant Craib